Yoshiharu Kohayakawa (Japanese: 小早川美晴; born 1963) is a Japanese-Brazilian mathematician working on discrete mathematics and probability theory. He is known for his work on Szemerédi's regularity lemma, which he extended to sparser graphs.

Biography
Kohayakawa was a student of Béla Bollobás at the University of Cambridge.

According to Google Scholar, as of August 21, 2019, Kohayakawa's works have been cited over 3194 times, and his h-index is 33.

He is a titular member of the Brazilian Academy of Sciences.

In 2000, five American researchers received a USA NSF Research Grant in the value of $20,000 to go to Brazil to work in collaboration with him on mathematical problems.

Kohayakawa has an Erdős number of 1.

He was awarded the 2018 Fulkerson Prize.

References

External links
Home Page of Yoshiharu Kohayakawa at the University of São Paulo

1963 births
Living people
20th-century Brazilian mathematicians
21st-century Brazilian mathematicians
Members of the Brazilian Academy of Sciences
Graph theorists
Alumni of the University of Cambridge
Academic staff of the University of São Paulo
Expatriate academics in Brazil